The Analysis Corporation (TAC) was the Intelligence Solutions business of Global Defense Technology & Systems, Inc. (GTEC), now Sotera Defense Solutions, a defense contracting company. Based in McLean, Virginia, it is a wholly owned subsidiary of Global Strategies Group (North America) Inc., the operating company of GTEC. From its inception in 1990 to its dissolution in 2012, TAC worked on projects in the counterterrorism and national security realm by supporting national watchlisting activities as well as other counterterrorism requirements.

History
TAC was founded in 1990 by Cecilia nmi Hayes, previous owner and partner in Analytic Methods Inc. (AMI) and current owner of TAC Commercial Services (TCS) and Nations Home Group. In 2004, TAC was purchased by SFA and maintained as a wholly owned subsidiary. Ms. Hayes remained president of TAC into 2005. In November 2005, John O. Brennan was appointed president and CEO of TAC.  Mr. Brennan was the former interim director of the National Counterterrorism Center and a 25-year veteran of the CIA.
 
In January 2009, Brennan was selected by President Barack Obama to serve in his administration as Homeland Security Adviser and Deputy National Security Adviser for Counterterrorism.  In March 2013, Brennan was appointed director of the Central Intelligence Agency.

Following Brennan's departure in October 2008 as advisor to then-presidential candidate Barack Obama, Alexander Drew became the acting president of TAC. Drew was named president in January 2009 and remained through February 2012, when TAC was dissolved and assimilated into Sotera Defense Solutions, formerly SFA, Global Strategies Group (North America), and GTEC.

Cooperation
GTEC's Intelligence Solutions business, which is staffed by other former senior officials from the Intelligence community, operates within almost every entity in the Intelligence Community including the US Department of State, Department of Homeland Security (DHS), Federal Bureau of Investigation (FBI), and Defense Intelligence Agency (DIA).

Key areas
Prior to 9/11, TAC was instrumental in providing pattern recognition and data mining software applications that served as the basis for the US Government's  original terrorist watchlist database  called TIPOFF.  In 2003, TAC assisted the Government in standing up the Terrorist Screening Center (TSC) the Terrorist Threat Integration Center (TTIC), and its successor, the National Counterterrorism Center (NCTC). Key practice areas included intelligence and Federal Law Enforcement support for terrorist screening, watchlist development and operations; intelligence analysis; systems integration and software development; multilingual name search; and pattern matching. It was awarded over $400m in government contracts since 2000, including some $30.6m in 2007, $19.5m in 2008, and $150m in 2009. Customers included the Department of State, National Targeting Center (NTC), Defense Intelligence Agency (DIA), National Security Agency (NSA), Office of Naval Intelligence (ONI), NCTC, TSC, and the FBI.

Passport info scandal

	 
In early 2008 TAC found itself in the midst of a scandal when a State Department spokesman revealed that a TAC contractor, formerly a retired State Department employee, gained unauthorized access on March 14 to the passport records for Barack Obama and John McCain. The TAC employee, who has not been named, is the only individual to have accessed both Obama's and McCain's passport information without proper authorization, a State Department spokesman said. The employee's actions triggered an electronic alarm system, according to sources familiar with the probe. TAC strongly disavowed the employee's actions in a subsequent press release.

References

External links
 Official site
 A collection of material related to the passport info scandal
 Spies for Hire

See also
 Airport security
 Civil defense
 High policing
 Infrastructure security
 Military-Industrial Complex
 Port security
 Supply chain security
 Terrorism in the United States

Defense companies of the United States
Software companies established in 1990
Companies based in Virginia
1990 establishments in Virginia
Software companies disestablished in 2012
2012 disestablishments in Virginia